Mícheál C. Cranitch (1 December 1912 – 23 November 1999) was an Irish Fianna Fáil politician. He was Cathaoirleach of Seanad Éireann in 1973.

Cranitch was born in Rathcormac, County Cork. In 1969 he was nominated by the Taoiseach Jack Lynch to the 12th Seanad. In 1973, he stood for election on the Administrative Panel, but did not win a seat. However, in 1977 he won a seat in the 14th Seanad, which he held until his defeat in the 1983 election to the 18th Seanad.

He served as Cathaoirleach of the Seanad, from January to June 1973.

References

1912 births
1999 deaths
Fianna Fáil senators
Cathaoirligh of Seanad Éireann
Members of the 12th Seanad
Members of the 14th Seanad
Members of the 15th Seanad
Members of the 16th Seanad
Politicians from County Cork
Nominated members of Seanad Éireann